Trouble for Nothing is a 1916 British silent comedy film directed by Maurice Elvey and starring Guy Newall, Hayford Hobbs and Jeff Barlow.

Cast
 Guy Newall as Rev. Cuthbert Cheese  
 Hayford Hobbs 
 Jeff Barlow 
 Winifred Sadler

References

Bibliography
 Murphy, Robert. Directors in British and Irish Cinema: A Reference Companion. British Film Institute, 2006.

External links
 

1916 films
British comedy films
British silent short films
1910s English-language films
Films directed by Maurice Elvey
1916 comedy films
British black-and-white films
1910s British films
Silent comedy films